Egon Bittner (April 16, 1921 – May 7, 2011) was born in Czechoslovakia and emigrated to the United States after World War II. He received his Ph.D. in sociology from the University of California at Los Angeles. He held the Harry Coplan Professorship in the Social Sciences and was chair of the sociology department at Brandeis University, where he supervised the dissertation of Nancy J. Chodorow. He is known for his ground breaking studies of the relationships between police and society.

His most notable work is The Functions of the Police in Modern Society (1970), in which he argues that police are defined by their capacity to use force. Other significant works include 
Aspects of Police Work (1990),The Capacity to Use Force as the Core of the Police Role (1985), Florence Nightingale in Pursuit of Willie Sutton: A Theory of the Police (1974), and The Police on Skid Row (1967). The latter first presented police discretion as a necessary and positive police attribute. The latter was featured by the Institute for Scientific Information (ISI) as "The Week's Citation Classic" on March 30, 1987.

Bittner's contributions to police scholarship earned him the Police Executive Research Forum's 1998 Leadership Award. 

The Bittner Award is in honor of Egon Bittner and is presented by the Commission on Accreditation for Law Enforcement Agencies (CALEA) to chief executive officers in recognition of their distinguished service in law enforcement and their leadership of an agency accredited by CALEA for fifteen continuous years.

Selected publications
The concept of organization. Social Research, 32 (3), 1965. 
J.-P. Brodeur. An Encounter with Egon Bittner. Crime, Law and Social Change, 2007, 48 (3-5), 105-132.
Police discretion in emergency apprehension of mentally ill persons. Social Problems'', 1967, 14, 278-292.

References

External links
Egon Bittner Award

American sociologists
1921 births
2011 deaths
Czechoslovak emigrants to the United States
University of California, Los Angeles alumni
Brandeis University faculty